Muqui is a municipality located in the Brazilian state of Espírito Santo. Its population was 15,526 (2020) and its area is 327 km².

The municipality contains part of the  Serra das Torres Natural Monument, created in 2010 to protect the mountain peaks in the area.

Etymology 
The word muqui is of indigenous origin, meaning "between hills", referring to its mountainous geography.

References

Municipalities in Espírito Santo